Arindam Bhattacharya (born 28 January 1980) is an Indian politician who is a MLA from the Indian state of West Bengal and Former President of West Bengal State Youth Congress. By profession he is a corporate and International Trade lawyer, a researcher, writer and social entrepreneur. Apart from being a legislator he is associated with many International organizations like the Parliamentarians for Global Action (PGA), GLOBE International and the United Nations Civil Society, where he is doing strong advocacy for democracy, civil rights and sustainable development. He is a member of the West Bengal Legislative Assembly.

Political career
He represents the Santipur (Vidhan Sabha constituency).

References

External links 
West Bengal Legislative Assembly

West Bengal MLAs 2016–2021
Living people
Indian National Congress politicians
Trinamool Congress politicians from West Bengal
1980 births
Bharatiya Janata Party politicians from West Bengal